The 1967–68 British Ice Hockey season featured the Northern League for teams from Scotland and the north of England. It had been known as the Scottish League during 1966-67.

Paisley Mohawks won the Northern League  the Icy Smith Cup and the Autumn Cup.

Northern League

Regular season

Spring Cup

Final
Paisley Mohawks defeated the Whitley Warriors 12:9 on aggregate (7:7, 5:2)

Icy Smith Cup Final
Paisley Mohawks defeated Durham Wasps by a score of 12–11 in the Icy Smith Cup Final, which was a tournament that was the forerunner of the British Championship playoffs.

Autumn Cup

Results

References

British
1967 in English sport
1968 in English sport
1967 in Scottish sport
1968 in Scottish sport